Zhilei Zhang (born May 2, 1983) is a Chinese professional boxer. As an amateur he won bronze medals at the 2007 and 2009 World Championships, and a silver medal at the 2008 Olympics, all in the super-heavyweight division. As of September 2022 he is rated as the 11th best heavyweight by The Ring.

Amateur career
In 2003 the southpaw lost in the first round of the World Championship to Polish fellow southpaw Grzegorz Kiełsa 22:8.

At the 2004 World University Boxing Championships he lost the final to Rustam Saidov.

In 2005 at the World Championships in his home country, he beat Vugar Alekperov 20:11 before losing to eventual winner Odlanier Solis (17:7).

Zhang lost at the 2007 World Amateur Boxing Championships to Ukrainian Vyacheslav Glazkov in the semifinals but qualified for the 2008 Summer Olympics. There he settled for silver, losing the final by KO to Italy's Roberto Cammarelle.

At the 2009 World Amateur Boxing Championships he again lost the semi to a Ukrainian in Roman Kapitanenko 2:5.

He qualified for the 2012 Olympics in London but was defeated by British boxer Anthony Joshua in the quarter finals on points, who would later go on to become a unified heavyweight world champion.

On March 10, 2014 in New York City, Zhilei Zhang announced that he would be turning pro. Zhang signed a promotional agreement with Dynasty Boxing, which is a promotional firm that specializes in the Chinese market.

Zhang knocked out Curtis Tate in the first 17 seconds of round one in his pro debut in Fallon, Nevada on August 8, 2014.

Olympic Games results
2008 (as a Super heavyweight)
Defeated Mohamed Amanissi (Morocco) 15-0
Defeated Ruslan Myrsatayev (Kazakhstan) 12-2
Defeated Vyacheslav Glazkov (Ukraine) walk-over
Lost to Roberto Cammarelle (Italy) RSCO

2012 (as a Super heavyweight)
Defeated Johan Linde (Australia) RSCO
Lost to Anthony Joshua (Great Britain) 11-15

World Championships results
2003 (as a Super heavyweight)
Lost to Grzegorz Kiełsa (Poland) 8-22

2005 (as a Super heavyweight)
Defeated Vugar Alekperov (Azerbaijan) 20-11
Lost to Odlanier Solis (Cuba) 7-17

2007 (as a Super heavyweight)
Defeated Nurpais Torobekov (Kyrgyzstan) RSCO
Defeated Rustam Rygebayev (Kazakhstan) 20-10
Defeated Daniel Beahan (Australia) KO 2
Lost to Vyacheslav Glazkov (Ukraine) 11-21

2009 (as a Super heavyweight)
Defeated Primislav Dimovski (Macedonia) 6-2
Lost to Roman Kapitanenko (Ukraine) 2-5

Professional career 
Zhang compiled a perfect record of 20–0 before fighting Andriy Rudenko in Monaco on 30 November 2019. He dominated the Ukrainian veteran and secured a convincing unanimous decision win, winning on all three scorecards, 99–91, 98–92 and 97–93.

In his next fight on 7 November 2020, Zhang fought Devin Vargas on the undercard of the WBC lightweight title fight between Devin Haney and Yuriorkis Gamboa. In his debut as a Matchroom Boxing fighter. Zhang dropped and stopped his opponent in the fourth round.

He returned to the ring on 27 February 2021 to fight journeyman Jerry Forrest on the undercard of the super-middleweight title fight between Canelo Álvarez and Avni Yıldırım. Although Zhang started strong, scoring three knockdowns in the opening three rounds of the bout, Forrest was able to battle his way back to earn a majority draw. The final scorecards read 95–93 Forrest, 93–93, and 93–93, with the irregular scores owing to a point deduction against Zhang for excessive holding. It was revealed that after the fight, Zhang was hospitalised and later diagnosed with "anemia, high enzyme levels, and low-level renal failure that may have been caused by severe dehydration". 

On 27 November 2021, Zhang faced Craig Lewis on the undercard of Teófimo López vs. George Kambosos Jr. Zhang started the fight off slowly, but dropped Lewis twice in round two, leading Lewis' corner to throw in the towel, giving Zhang a TKO win.

Zhang was scheduled to fight Filip Hrgović in an IBF title eliminator on 7 May 2022; however, Hrgović pulled out of the fight on 2 May, stating that he had not been able to focus during his training camp due to the death of his father. Scott Alexander was chosen as the replacement fight on the Canelo Álvarez vs. Dmitry Bivol undercard, with the fight being dropped from the co-main to the undercard. Zhang won the bout via first-round knockout. His fight against Hrgović was rescheduled for 20 August 2022 in Jeddah, Saudi Arabia on the undercard of Oleksandr Usyk vs Anthony Joshua II. On the night, Zhang knocked down Hrgović in the first round with a right hand shot. After a close-fought battle over twelve rounds, the judges awarded the fight to Hrgović with scores of 115–112 twice and 114–113, in what was described as a "generous" decision by broadcaster Sky Sports after a "bizarre" performance by Hrgović.

On 2 February 2023, it was officially announced that Zhang would be returning to the ring at the Copper Box Arena in London, England on 15 April, against undefeated WBO interim champion Joe Joyce.

Personal life 
As of March 2021, Zhang resides in Bloomfield, New Jersey.

Professional boxing record

References

External links
 Results (amateur-boxing.strefa.pl)
 
 
Zhilei Zhang - Profile, News Archive & Current Rankings at Box.Live

1983 births
Living people
Super-heavyweight boxers
Olympic boxers of China
Boxers at the 2008 Summer Olympics
Boxers at the 2012 Summer Olympics
Olympic silver medalists for China
Sportspeople from Henan
Olympic medalists in boxing
Asian Games medalists in boxing
Boxers at the 2010 Asian Games
Medalists at the 2008 Summer Olympics
Chinese male boxers
AIBA World Boxing Championships medalists
Asian Games gold medalists for China
Medalists at the 2010 Asian Games
People from Zhoukou